Central Department Store (Pinyin: Shàngtài) is a Thai department store chain, owned by Central Group. It has branches in Thailand and Indonesia, and is also a Royal Warrant holder of the Thai Royal Family.

History 
In 1927, 22-year-old Tiang Chirathivat, an immigrant from mainland China, started a store in Bangkok named "Keng Seng Lee" or "baskets for sale", which was the start of an emporium.

Later that year, the store moved to Charoen Krung Road, in Bangkok's Si Phraya District. The store sold a large variety of local and international newspapers and magazines and carried the name "Central Trading Store". This was the first chapter of Central Department Stores' history.

In the 1950s, the company grew with more and more stores selling different items. It was one few stores in Bangkok that had the courage to order imported goods for sale and was the first to set up merchandising displays.

In 1973, the Chidlom store opened under the new "one stop shopping" concept. Here customers could come to Central and buy everything they needed under one roof.

In 1981, the Central Lad Ya Branch opened it doors and was the largest of its kind then. Later in 1983 CentralPlaza Lardprao opened it doors and was the largest shopping mall in Thailand at that time.

On 20 December 2005, King Bhumibol Adulyadej conferred on the company a Royal Warrant for its services, meaning they could display the royal Garuda emblem.

By 2010 Central operated 15 stores in Thailand and planned to open more.

In 2019, Central announced that it plans to splurge at least 10 billion baht between 2020 and 2024 to renovate 20 of its stores into a "lifestyle" concept, following the renaming of Zen, Central's lifestyle trend megastore brand, into Central. The CentralWorld branch will serve as the prototype of Central's new concept. For the first phase, Central Chidlom and two Central stores in CentralPlaza Ladprao and CentralPlaza Rama II will be renovated in 2020.

Stores

Bangkok Metropolitan Area
 Central Chidlom (standalone, first branch, flagship store)
 Central@CentralWorld (previously ZEN, flagship store)
 Central Ladprao (first shopping mall branch, flagship store)
 Central Ramindra
 Central Bangna
 Central Pinklao
 Central Rama III
 Central Rama II
 Central Chaengwattana
 Central Salaya
 Central WestGate
 Central EastVille
 Central WestVille
 Central Embassy (Central Childom's neighboring shopping mall, management in partnership with CPN)
 Central Park at Dusit Central Park (under construction)
 Future Park Rangsit
 Mega City Bangna (Mega Bangna Zone)
 Central Nakhon Sawan
 Central Nakhon Pathom

Southern Thailand
 Central Phuket – Floresta Building (previously located at Festival Building, Central's Central Phuket branch moved to Floresta in 2018)
 Central Patong (standalone) 
 Central Hatyai (Kanchanavanich Road)
 Central Samui

Eastern Thailand
 Central Pattaya
 House of Si Racha (Playhouse and Living House) Central Si Racha

Northeastern Thailand
 Central Korat
 Central Udon
 Central Khon Kaen

Northern Thailand
Central Chiangmai (CentralFestival Chiangmai)

Indonesia
Central Department Store Grand Indonesia, Jakarta
Central Department Store Neo Soho, Jakarta (Closed down from February 18, 2019)

See also
 Zen Department Store
 Robinson Department Store
 The Mall Department Store

References

External links
Central Thailand official website
Central China official website

Retail companies established in 1927
Department stores of Thailand
Companies based in Bangkok
Thai Royal Warrant holders
1927 establishments in Siam
Thai brands